Silvia Prada (born 1969 in León, Spain) is an artist who lives and works in New York City. Her work as an illustrator and decorative artist has been described as a monochromatic and geometric documentation of pop culture. Capturing a fetishistic representation of defining moments and iconography. Her work was featured for the first time in The Face magazine in 2002. She has helped shape the movement of contemporary illustration art of the past decade and contributed artwork to a number of leading arts and culture publications including The Face, Dazed & Confused, BlackBook, VMagazine, VMAN, Tokion, Candy Magazine Fanzine 137 and EY Magateen.

Prada's works and large-scale illustration and/or poster installations have been showcased in museums, art fairs and galleries worldwide including MoCA Shanghai, Colette in Paris and Deitch Projects in New York

She self-published "The Silvia Prada Art Book" in 2006, an anarchic reflection about the history of fashion in a visual dialogue with decorative painters of the last century. . "The New Modern Man: A Styling Chart", published in 2012, features a series of stylized portraits highlighting male hairstyles juxtaposed with geometric drawings, paying homage to the barbershop and the subtle nuances and cues that help define the male persona, identity and representation within the parameters of visual and popular culture.

Solo exhibitions
2018 
Silvia Prada at TOM House Exhibit. Los Angeles 

2013 
The New Modern Hair. Pacific Design Center, Los Angeles

2010 
Let's Get Busy. Jesus Gallardo Gallery. Guanajuato, Mexico

2009 
Pin up War. Galería Casado Santapau, Madrid

2008 
Fever. Art Lab. MoCA. Shanghai, China

2007 
House of Pop. Galería Lluciá Homs. Barcelona

2005 
All Things Pop. CASM, Centro de Arte Santa Mónica. Barcelona
Hot or Not. Laboratorio 987.MUSAC. Museo de Arte Contemporáneo de Castilla y León

Selected group exhibitions
2018
Fortnight Institute, Antifurniture.

2011
Grafika, Instituto Cervantes, Madrid
Zona Maco Art Fair. Mexico City
Cruised or to be Cruised. Galería Casado Santapau, Madrid
Huespedes. MNBA. Museo nacional de Bellas Artes. Buenos Aires. Argentina

2007
Existencias. MUSAC, Museo de Arte Contemporáneo de Castilla y León
My 2007. Colette Gallery, Paris
Arco'06. Galería lluciá Hom, Barcelona

2006
Cavalier Book Project. Nog Gallery, London
World Painting. Galería Strany de la Mota, Barcelona
Próximamente. Museo de Arte Contemporáneo Carrillo Gil, México DF
Arco'06. Galería lluciá Homs, Barcelona
2005
Arco'05. Galería Lluciá Homs, Barcelona

2004
Edad Perversa. Galería Horrach Moyá, Mallorca

2004
BlackBook. Deitch Projects Gallery, New York

2003
Paper Chic. Círculo de Bellas Artes, Madrid
V Convocatoria de Jóvenes Artistas. Galería Luis Adelantado, Valencia
1996
8ª Primavera Fotográfica de Cataluña. Departamento de Cultura de la Generalitat de Cataluña. Can Felipa, Barcelona

1994
Uno Cada Uno. Galería Juana de Aizpuru, Madrid.

Collections
MOCA Shanghai
MUSAC. Museo de Arte Contemporáneo de Castilla y León

Commercial commissions

2020
MIU MIU 2020  

2013
MSGM, S/S 2013 Advertisement campaign

2012
(MALIN+GOETZ), New York and Los Angeles.
Ordinary House, Vienna

2008
Uniqlo Soccer. Tokyo, Japan

2006
Nike Global, " Always on the Run"

2005
Danzha Vodka

2004
Barcelona Fashion Week

2003
GAS/DESIGN/EXCHANGE/TOKYO

Magazine commissions

2020
Playgirl Magazine 

2011
V (US). #68, The Who Cares About Age Issue
V (US). #70, The Star Power Issue
Pin-Up Magazine. #11, Illustration for a conversation between Rem Koolhas and Francesco Vezzoli
Dirty Magazine. Charlotte Free Portraits

2010
Candy (Spain), Who's That Girl Issue
V Man (US). #15, Dream Blond
Hercules. Pedro Almodóvar Special

2009
Tokion (US). One to One, Silvia Prada on Jeff Koons
Hercules Universal, The New Kid on the Block Issue

2008
Dazed & Confused (UK). An Issue of Reinvention
EY! Magateen. In Loving Memory

2007
Fanzine 137 (Spain). 5.137, Matt Dillon. Heartbeats Accelerating

2004
BlackBook (US). The Arts Issue
Carlos (UK). Good Bye Great Britain

2003
The Face (UK). Trouble in Sunnydale
The Face (UK). 2002 Review, Not Forgotten Issue

2002
The Face (UK). The Creatives Issue

2002
Dazed & Confused (UK). 10th Anniversary Issue

Books and editions
2020
Peter Berlin: Icon, Artist, Photosexual 
2012
THE NEW MODERN HAIR: A STYLING CHART, Co-published by cultureEDIT and Silvia Prada
THE NEW MODERN HAIR: A STYLING CHART, Foldout Poster

2010
RICHARD GERE ON FAKE KANDINSKY PIN UP POSTER

2006
THE SILVIA PRADA ART BOOK, Published by Silvia Prada

References

External links
 http://www.silviaprada.com
 http://www.oamadrid.com/artists.php
 
https://web.archive.org/web/20120623143206/http://www.culture-edit.com/representation

Living people
Spanish artists
1969 births
Spanish women artists